Aboite Township is one of twenty townships in Allen County, Indiana, United States. As of the 2010 census, its population was 35,765, up from 28,338 in 2000.

History
Aboite Township was named from the Aboite Creek, which is derived from the French word for "minnow".

Geography

Cities and towns
 Fort Wayne (western portion)

Unincorporated towns
 Dunfee (partial) at 
 Ellison at 
 Ellisville at 
 Timbercrest at

Fort Wayne neighborhoods
 Brierwood Hills at 
 Covington Dells at 
 Forest Ridge at 
 Liberty Hills at 
 Manor Woods at 
 Parkway Hills at 
 Rolling Hills at 
 Westlakes at 
 Westlawn at

Adjacent townships
 Lake Township (north)
 Washington Township (northeast)
 Wayne Township (east)
 Lafayette Township (south)
 Jackson Township, Huntington County (southwest)
 Jefferson Township, Whitley County (west)
 Union Township, Whitley County (northwest)

Major highways

Cemeteries
The township contains these two cemeteries: Covington Memorial Gardens and Oak Grove.

Airports and landing strips
 Dennis Airport

School districts
 Metropolitan School District of Southwest Allen County

Political districts
 Indiana's 3rd congressional district
 State House District 82
 State House District 83
 State Senate District 16

References

Citations

Sources
 
 United States Census Bureau 2008 TIGER/Line Shapefiles
 IndianaMap

External links

 

Townships in Allen County, Indiana
Fort Wayne, IN Metropolitan Statistical Area
Townships in Indiana